ALTEN is a French multinational engineering and technology consulting company founded in 1988, it has offices in 30 countries. ALTEN's stock is listed in compartment B of the Euronext Paris market (ISIN FR0000071946); it is part of the SBF 120, the IT CAC 50 index and MIDCAP 100, and is eligible for the Deferred Settlement Service (SRD).

In 2022, ALTEN had 54,100 employees and reported a revenue of 3.78 Bn euros. The French market accounts for 45% of the group's activity.

Company Profile 
ALTEN operates as a technology consulting and engineering company worldwide. It provides design and research projects for the technical and information systems divisions in the industrial, telecommunications, and service sectors. It is engaged in the studies and conception of technological products for technical divisions. The company also provides networks and telecoms architecture, as well as develops IT systems for information systems departments.

ALTEN provides services in industries such as telecommunications, computer systems, networking, multimedia, defense, aviation, and information systems.

History 
ALTEN was founded in 1988 by Simon Azoulay, Laurent Schwarz and Thierry Woog; three engineers from major schools.

Development of its establishment in France and expansion of its activities between 1988 and 1997, then IPO in 1999 on the second market of the Paris Stock Exchange. The international development started in 2000 represented 20% of turnover in 2003. Expansion towards Asia and the United States in 2012. The Group has since pursued a strategy of targeted business acquisitions in line with its core business in Europe, particularly in 2016. Thus, in 2019, the international share represented 56.8% of Group revenue.

Organization 
The ALTEN Group is organized into 5 operating divisions :
 Paris Engineering and Technology Consulting (ETC) Division
 Paris Networks Telecoms & Information Systems (NTIS) Division
 French Regions Division
 International Division
 Solutions Division: specialized and transnational companies among which MI-GSO (PMO and program management), Anotech Energy (oil and gas operations), Atexis (customer support engineering), Avenir Conseil (technical training) and PCU3ED (Global leader in Program and Project Management)

Services 

 Engineering and R&D outsourcing
 IT & Network Services
 Consulting, Expertise and Customer Support

Acquisitions 
 in 2011: Calsoft Labs (India and USA), Bardenheuer (Germany), Enea Consulting (Sweden).
 in 2014: cPrime Inc.(USA)
 in 2015: EclipseIT BV (The Netherlands)
 in 2019: Quick Release (UK)
 in 2022: Volansys (India and USA)

Labor disputes in Alten Spain 
From July to December 2012, Alten Spain fired more than a hundred employees, claiming a sales decrease.
In December 2012 Alten Spain tried to fire 140 of its employees and impose a 10% pay cut on the rest. As a consequence, Alten workers called for strike in January 2013.

References

External links

Engineering companies of France
Engineering consulting firms of France
Consulting firms established in 1988
International engineering consulting firms
International information technology consulting firms
International management consulting firms
1988 establishments in France
Companies listed on Euronext Paris